Çetenli, Altınözü is a village in the Hatay Province, Turkey. located at  36°6'43"N and 36°17'40"E near the Syrian border. The nearest large cities are Antakya, Kırıkhan and İskenderun.

References

Hatay Province
Altınözü District